Trigonopterus aeneomicans is a species of flightless weevil in the genus Trigonopterus from Indonesia.

Etymology
The specific name is derived from Latin aeneus, meaning "copper" or "bronze", and micans, meaning "shining", referring to the metallic sheen of the species elytra.

Description
The holotype measured 2.25mm long.  General coloration is black, with rust-colored antennae and dark rust-colored legs.  The elytra have a bronze sheen.

Range

References

aeneomicans
Beetles described in 2014
Beetles of Asia